Gustav Kalkun (22 March 1898 – 24 April 1972) was an Estonian discus thrower. He competed at the 1924 and 1928 Olympics and placed 15th and 10th, respectively. He was selected as the Olympic flag bearer for Estonia in 1928.

Kalkun graduated from school in Riga, Latvia (1916), and then studied physical education in Tartu, Estonia (1927), and Geneva, Switzerland (1930). He fought as a volunteer in World War I and Estonian War of Independence. He later worked as a physical education teacher in Tallinn, Narva and Tartu and acted as a referee and journalist covering athletics and basketball. In 1944, when Soviet troops arrived in Estonia, he emigrated to the United States. He was physical director of the YMCA in London, Ontario until 1950, when he took the same position at the YMCA in Sault Ste. Marie, Ontario. He was married to Waralda Ilmatara Kalkun, who died in 1967. Kalkun died at a hospital in Windsor, Ontario, in 1972.

Kalkun's nephew was actor Karl Kalkun, whose son is the sports journalist .

References

1898 births
1972 deaths
Sportspeople from Tartu
People from Kreis Dorpat
Estonian male discus throwers
Olympic athletes of Estonia
Athletes (track and field) at the 1924 Summer Olympics
Athletes (track and field) at the 1928 Summer Olympics
Estonian emigrants to the United States
Estonian World War II refugees